Yvonne Ann Chapman (born 20 January 1940) is an Australian politician with the National Party. She was a Queensland Member of Parliament from 1983 until 1989 ''where she was for a time Minister for Family Services in the Bjelke-Petersen Government and Minister for Transport and Ethnic Affairs in the Cooper Government', and Mayor of the Shire of Pine Rivers (1994–2008).

Background 
Chapman contested the 1994 mayoral election against sitting Shire Chairman Rob Akers and 4 others. In addition to being the first time the Shire elected a Mayor, it was also the first time a preferential ballot was used. Akers received the majority of the first preferences but Chapman was victorious after the distribution of preferences.

This was the second time Chapman had defeated Rob Akers at a significant election, having taken the Queensland Parliamentary seat of Pine Rivers from him in 1983.

Legacy 
Yvonne Chapman was the first woman to hold a Cabinet position in the Queensland Parliament, and was the first and last Mayor of Pine Rivers Shire (previous leaders of the Council were known as the Shire Chairman). Chapman established herself as a conservative persona, maintaining Pine Rivers to be a 'clean' shire. She disallowed the operation of adult-orientated stores and businesses, and once suggested the removal of doors from men's public toilets, for fear of sexual activity taking place at night.

She retired from politics in 2008 after the abolition of her native Shire of Pine Rivers and its merger into the larger Moreton Bay Regional Council, neither contesting the mayoral or council ballots for the new entity.

References 

1940 births
National Party of Australia members of the Parliament of Queensland
Living people
Members of the Queensland Legislative Assembly
Women members of the Queensland Legislative Assembly